Ioannis Miaoulis (1803–1830) was a Greek naval officer.  He was the third son of Andreas Miaoulis, a revolutionary leader and a member of the Miaoulis family from Hydra.

Biography
He was born in Hydra. During the Greek War of Independence, he commanded a ship in the squadron of vice-admiral Georgios Sachtouris and distinguished himself in a naval battle between Kythira and Crete. Later, he moved to Athens, where the Acropolis was still held by an Ottoman garrison. There he was infected by typhoid fever and died in 1830 at the age of 27.

1803 births
1830 deaths
Hellenic Navy officers
Ioannis
Greek military leaders of the Greek War of Independence
Infectious disease deaths in Greece
Deaths from typhoid fever
People from Hydra (island)